San Miguel Island is an island under the jurisdiction of the Philippine province of Masbate. The island has a lighthouse mounted atop a concrete tower. San Miguel Island is located "just off the northern tip" of Ticao Island.

See also

 List of islands of the Philippines

References

Islands of Masbate